Helmut Hadwiger (17 April 1922 – 22 October 2004) was an Austrian ski jumper. He competed in the individual event at the 1948 Winter Olympics.

References

1922 births
2004 deaths
Austrian male ski jumpers
Olympic ski jumpers of Austria
Ski jumpers at the 1948 Winter Olympics
Sportspeople from Villach
20th-century Austrian people